Jim Sullivan (2 December 1903 – 14 September 1977) was a Welsh rugby league player, and coach. Sullivan joined Wigan in June 1921 after starting his career in rugby union. A right-footed toe-end style (rather than round the corner style) goal-kicking , he scored 4,883 points in a career that spanned 25 years with Wigan, and still holds several records with the club today.

He made a combined total of 60 appearances at representative level with England, Wales, Great Britain and Other Nationalities, and his 26 appearances with Wales was still a record for many years after his death. He also represented Wales in British baseball.

Early life
Sullivan was born at Cardiff, Glamorgan, Wales. He attended St Alban's School, and joined his hometown rugby union team Cardiff at the age of 16. He made his début against Neath in October 1920, and went on to make 38 appearances for the club. In December 1920, 26-days after his seventeenth birthday, he played for the Barbarians in a match against Newport, becoming the youngest player to represent the team. His performances attracted the attention of several rugby league clubs, including Wakefield Trinity, Hull FC, Huddersfield and Wigan. While playing for Cardiff, Sullivan served an apprenticeship to become a boilermaker. He was also a British baseball player, and appeared for Wales in a match against England in 1921.

Rugby league career
In June 1921, Sullivan turned professional and joined rugby league side Wigan, reportedly signing a 12-year contract for a fee of £750. He made his début in August 1921, converting five goals in a 21–0 victory over Widnes. He made his first representative appearance in December 1921, playing for Wales in a 16–21 defeat against Australia.

Jim Sullivan played , and scored 4-conversions in Wigan's 13-2 victory over Oldham in the Championship Final during the 1921–22 season at The Cliff, Broughton on Saturday 6 May 1922, played , and scored 4-conversions in the 22-10 victory over Warrington in the Championship Final during the 1925–26 season at Knowsley Road, St. Helens on Saturday 8 May 1926. played , and scored 2-conversions, and a drop goal in Wigan's 15–3 victory over Salford in the Championship Final during the 1933–34 season at Wilderspool Stadium, Warrington on Saturday 28 April 1934, and played  in the 12–5 victory over Dewsbury in the Championship Final second-leg during the 1943–44 season at Crown Flatt, Dewsbury on Saturday 20 May 1944 (Joe Jones having played  in the first-leg).

Jim Sullivan played , and scored 4 conversions in Wigan's 20–2 victory over Leigh in the 1922–23 Lancashire Cup Final at the Willows in Weaste, Salford on Saturday 25 November 1922, played , and scored a conversion in the 11–15 defeat by Swinton in the 1925–26 Lancashire Cup Final  at The Cliff, Broughton on Wednesday 9 December 1925, played , and scored a conversion in the 2–5 defeat by Swinton in the 1927–28 Lancashire Cup Final  at Watersheddings, Oldham on Saturday 19 November 1927, played , and scored a conversion in the 5–4 victory over Widnes in the 1928–29 Lancashire Cup Final the Willows, Salford, on Saturday 24 November 1928, played , and scored 2-conversions in the 12–21 defeat by Salford in the 1934–35 Lancashire Cup Final  at Station Road, Swinton, on Saturday 20 October 1934, played , and scored 2-conversions in the 7–15 defeat by Salford in the 1935–36 Lancashire Cup Final at Wilderspool Stadium, Warrington on Saturday 19 October 1935, played , and scored a conversion in the 2–5 defeat by Salford in the 1936–37 Lancashire Cup Final  at Wilderspool, Warrington on Saturday 17 October 1936, and played  and scored 5-conversions in the 10–7 victory over Salford in the 1938–39 Lancashire Cup Final during the 1938–39 season at Station Road, Swinton on Saturday 22 October 1938.

On 14 February 1925, he landed 22 goals against amateurs Flimby & Fothergill in the Challenge Cup, which is still a record. He toured with the Great Britain Lions three times (1924, 1928 and 1932) and was captain on the last occasion. He top-scored on all three tours. He refused what would have been a record fourth trip, in 1936, for personal reasons.

He was Wales' most capped player for over 70 years before his record was surpassed by Ian Watson in 2010. During the Second World War, he played infrequently for Wigan, as he chose to appear as a guest for a number of other clubs, including Dewsbury, Keighley and Bradford Northern. His last season before retiring was in 1945–46 – the season when the peacetime league resumed – and played his last game against Batley in February 1946.

When he removed his Wigan jersey for the last time, he had made 774 appearances and amassed 2,317 goals and 4,883 points for the club. These figures are still unchallenged. He scored a club record of 161 goals in 1934-35 and a record total of 204 goals in 1933-34 (including representative games). He had won three league Championships, two Challenge Cups and three Lancashire Cups.

Appearance record
Sullivan holds the world record for the most first team appearances in the sport of Rugby League. In his 25 year career, Sullivan made 928 first team appearances, a figure unmatched anywhere in the world.

Coaching career
Having been captain-coach at Wigan since 1932, Sullivan continued managing the team after retiring as a player in 1946, creating one of the club's greatest sides by winning a record five championships and a brace of Challenge Cups.

Sullivan was the coach in Wigan's 8-3 victory over Bradford Northern in the 1948–49 Challenge Cup Final  at Wembley Stadium, London on Saturday 1 May 1948, in front of a crowd of 91,465.

In 1952 he joined St. Helens, overseeing their rise. Sullivan was the coach in St. Helens' 10–15 defeat by Huddersfield in the 1952-53 Challenge Cup Final  at Wembley Stadium, London on Saturday 25 April 1953, in front of a crowd of 89,588, and was the coach in the 13-2 victory over Halifax in the 1955 -56 Challenge Cup Final  at Wembley Stadium, London on Saturday 28 April 1956, in front of a crowd of 79,341.

Sullivan was the coach in St. Helens' 44–22 victory over Hunslet in the Championship Final during the 1958–59 season at Odsal Stadium, Bradford on Saturday 16 May 1959.

He later returned to Wigan as coach in 1961, but left months later due to ill health.

Jim Sullivan died in his home town of Cardiff on 1 November 1977 at the age of 73. He was one of the inaugural inductees of the British Rugby League Hall of Fame in October 1988. He is also an inductee of the Wigan Hall of Fame, and the St Helens Hall of Fame.

References

External links
Player Statistics at wigan.rlfans.com
Coach Statistics at wigan.rlfans.com
(archived by web.archive.org) Jim Sullivan at rugbyleaguehistory.co.uk

1903 births
1977 deaths
Barbarian F.C. players
Batley Bulldogs players
British Empire rugby league team players
Cardiff RFC players
England national rugby league team players
Footballers who switched code
Glamorgan and Monmouthshire rugby league team players
Glamorgan rugby league team players
Great Britain national rugby league team captains
Great Britain national rugby league team players
Other Nationalities rugby league team players
Players of British baseball
Rochdale Hornets coaches
Rugby league fullbacks
Rugby league players from Cardiff
Rugby union players from Cardiff
St Helens R.F.C. coaches
Wales national rugby league team captains
Wales national rugby league team players
Welsh rugby league coaches
Welsh rugby league players
Welsh rugby union players
Wigan Warriors coaches
Wigan Warriors players